The International Exhibition in Plovdiv was an international exhibition that was held from June 7 to July 7 of 1991 in the city of Plovdiv, Bulgaria, under the theme of "The creative activity of young inventors at the service of a world peace." The exhibition was coordinated by the Bureau International des Expositions.

Organizers
The organizers of the exhibition were:
The Ministry of Economy and Planning of Bulgaria
The Chamber of Commerce and Industry of Bulgaria
The Republican Council of scientific and technical creativity of the youth of Bulgaria
International Foundation "Ludmila Jivkova"
The Institute of inventions and rationalizations.

The exhibition was organized with the cooperation of the World Intellectual Property Organization, a specialized agency of the United Nations.

References

External links
 Official website of the BIE
 European Patent Office

See also
International Inventions Exhibition: 1885 in London
List of world's fairs

June 1991 events in Europe
July 1991 events in Europe
World's fairs in Bulgaria
History of Plovdiv
1991 in Bulgaria
History of inventions